Cherif Rahmani was the Algerian minister for supply in the 1995 government of Mokdad Sifi.
He was the Minister of Tourism around 2002 and created the World Deserts Foundation.

References 

Living people
Year of birth missing (living people)
Algerian politicians
21st-century Algerian people